Jacobs House may refer to:

in the United States
(by state, then town or city)
 Judge Fred C. Jacobs House, Phoenix, Arizona, listed on the National Register of Historic Places (NRHP)
 Jacobs House (Wickenburg, Arizona), listed on the NRHP in Maricopa County
 Moore–Jacobs House, Clarendon, Arkansas, listed on the NRHP in Monroe County
 O'Kane–Jacobs House, Altus, Arkansas, listed on the NRHP in Franklin County
 Cyrus Jacobs House, Boise, Idaho, listed on the NRHP in Ada County
 Johnston-Jacobs House, Georgetown, Kentucky, NRHP-listed
 Eugene Jacobs House, Owosso, Michigan, listed on the NRHP in Shiawassee County
 Michael Jacobs House, Columbus, Montana, listed on the NRHP in Stillwater County
 Felix A. Jacobs House, Columbus, Ohio, listed on the NRHP in Columbus
 Jacobs–Wilson House, Portland, Oregon, NRHP-listed
 Durham–Jacobs House, Portland, Oregon, NRHP-listed
 Benjamin Jacobs House, West Whiteland Township, Pennsylvania, NRHP-listed
 Herbert and Katherine Jacobs First House, Madison, Wisconsin, NRHP-listed
 Herbert and Katherine Jacobs Second House, Madison, Wisconsin, NRHP-listed